Silver Air is a small Czech airline headquartered in Prague, offering both passenger and cargo services. Despite being a Czech airline, its passenger services are based at Marina di Campo Airport in Italy, while its cargo services operate exclusively in Romania.

Destinations

Passenger
As of April 2022, Silver Air serves the following passenger destinations:
Italy
Bologna – Bologna Guglielmo Marconi Airport seasonal
Elba – Marina di Campo Airport base
Florence - Florence-Peretola Airport
Milan – Linate Airport seasonal
Pisa - Pisa International Airport

Switzerland
Lugano - Lugano Airport seasonal

Cargo
Romania
Timișoara – Timișoara Traian Vuia International Airport
Cluj-Napoca – Cluj International Airport

Fleet
The Silver Air fleet includes the following aircraft (as of 10 September 2015):

2 Let L-410 Turbolet

References

External links

Airlines of the Czech Republic
Airlines established in 1995
Czech companies established in 1995